Michael O'Dwyer (born 9 June 1936) is an Irish retired Gaelic football manager and former player. He most famously managed the senior Kerry county team between 1974 and 1989, during which time he became the county's longest-serving manager and most successful in terms of major titles won. O'Dwyer is regarded as the greatest manager in the history of the game. He is one of only three men to manage five different counties (he was preceded in reaching this total by Mickey Moran in 2008 and emulated by John Maughan in 2018). Martin Breheny has described him as "the ultimate symbol of the outside manager".

Born in Waterville, County Kerry, O'Dwyer was introduced to Gaelic football by the local national school teacher who organized games between schools in the area. He enjoyed divisional championship success during a thirty-year club career with Waterville. O'Dwyer also won three championship medals with South Kerry.

O'Dwyer made his debut on the inter-county scene at the age of seventeen when he first linked up with the Kerry minor team. An All-Ireland runner-up in this grade, O'Dwyer subsequently made his senior debut during the 1956–57 league. He went on to play a key role for Kerry in attack during a hugely successful era, and won four All-Ireland medals, eleven Munster medals and seven National Football League medals. He was an All-Ireland runner-up on five occasions.

As a member of the Munster inter-provincial team, O'Dwyer won one Railway Cup medal in 1972. Throughout his inter-county career he made 48 championship appearances. O'Dwyer retired from inter-county football following the conclusion of the 1974 championship.

O'Dwyer was appointed manager of the Kerry senior team prior to the start of the 1974-75 league. He went on to lead Kerry through a period of unprecedented provincial and national dominance, winning twenty two major honours. These include eight All-Ireland Championships, including a record-equaling four-in-a-row between 1978 and 1981 and a three-in-a-row between 1984 and 1986, eleven Munster Championships in twelve seasons and three National Leagues, including two league-championship doubles. O'Dwyer simultaneously took charge of the Kerry under-21 team, winning three successive All-Ireland Championships. His tenure in charge of the Munster team saw the province claim six Railway Cups.

After ending his fifteen-year managerial tenure with Kerry, O'Dwyer moved to Leinster where he took charge of Kildare between 1990 and 1994. After making Kildare a competitive footballing force during that period, he was reappointed for a second tenure in 1996. O'Dwyer ended a 42-year provincial famine with the securing of two Leinster titles, while Kildare also made their first All-Ireland final appearance in seventy years. In 2002 O'Dwyer moved to Laois where he helped end a 57-year wait for a Leinster title.

O'Dwyer remained in Leinster after his Laois tenure and began a five-year stint as Wicklow manager in 2006. Wicklow secured the Tommy Murphy Cup in 2007 and brought them to the last 12 in 2009 for the first time ever. O'Dwyer ended his managerial career with an unsuccessful one-year stint in charge of Clare.

Early life
Mick O'Dwyer was born on 9 June 1936. He was born in the little village of Waterville, County Kerry. He was educated locally at St Finian's national school before later attending Waterville Technical School.

Playing career

Minor and junior
O'Dwyer first played for Kerry as a member of the minor team in 1954. He made his debut against Waterford, however, he was dropped from the starting fifteen for the subsequent 4–10 to 1-3 Munster final defeat of Cork. On 26 September 1954, O'Dwyer was listed amongst the substitutes once again for the All-Ireland final against Dublin. Two late goals resulted in a 3–3 to 1–8 defeat for Kerry.

After joining the Kerry junior team in 1955, O'Dwyer won a Munster medal in this grade the following year after a 4–10 to 1–4 defeat of Waterford.

Senior
O'Dwyer is his county's top scorer in National Football League history, finishing his career with 19–313 (370) in that competition. As of 2021, he remained in the top ten all-time scorers in that competition, though he had been passed by numerous players including Ronan Carolan of Cavan, Mattie Forde of Wexford, Steven McDonnell of Armagh, Conor McManus of Monaghan, Brian Stafford of Meath and David Tubridy of Clare.

Beginnings
O'Dwyer made his senior debut for Kerry in a 0–9 to 0-6 National Football League defeat of Carlow on the 21 October 1956. He received his first championship start on 2 June 1957 in an infamous and shock 2–5 to 0–10 defeat by Waterford.

In 1958 O'Dwyer was named at right wing-back in his first provincial decider. A 2–7 to 0-3 drubbing of old rivals Cork gave him his first Munster SFC medal.

Early All-Ireland successes
O'Dwyer experienced further success in 1959 as Kerry secured the league title. The 2–8 to 1–8 defeat of Derry gave him his first league medal. O'Dwyer later added a second Munster SFC medal to his collection following a 2–15 to 2–8 defeat of Cork. On 27 September 1959, Kerry faced Galway in the All-Ireland SFC decider. Every aspect of that game seemed to go Kerry's way. A punched Tom Long ball was forced into the net by Dan McAuliffe for Kerry's opening goal. McAuliffe struck again when goalkeeper Jimmy Farrell dropped the ball accidentally in the goalmouth, while substitute Garry McMahon slipped as he sent the third into the net in the final few minutes. A 3–7 to 1–4 score line gave Kerry the title and gave O'Dwyer his first All-Ireland SFC medal.

Kerry made it three-in-a-row in Munster in 1960. The 3–15 to 0–8 defeat of Waterford gave O'Dwyer his third Munster SFC medal. A second consecutive All-Ireland final appearance quickly followed on 11 September 1960, with Down providing the opposition. The game was played on an even keel for much of the first-half; however, an important incident turned the game in the Ulster men's favour eleven minutes after the interval. Kevin Mussen's line ball found Dan McCartan who sent in a high forty-yard lob which Kerry goalkeeper Johnny Culloty dropped over the goal-line. Two minutes later Paddy Doherty was pulled down in the square. He converted the subsequent penalty which put Down six points up. An historic final score of 2–10 to 0–8 resulted in a defeat for O'Dwyer's side, while the Sam Maguire Cup crossed the border into Northern Ireland for the first time.

Kerry reached the final of the 1960–61 league and, for the second time in three years, Derry were the opponent. The northerners put up little opposition as Kerry secured a 4–16 to 1–5 victory. It was O'Dwyer's second National League medal. He later collected a fourth successive Munster SFC medal following a 2–13 to 1-4 replay defeat of Cork.

O'Dwyer won a fifth successive provincial title in 1962 following yet another 4–8 to 0-4 trouncing of Cork. On 23 September 1962, Kerry faced Roscommon in what has been described as possibly the worst championship decider of them all. Garry McMahon went into the history books as he scored Kerry's first goal after just thirty-five seconds. Kerry fielded the resultant kick-out and Timmy O'Sullivan got the first of Kerry's twelve points of the day. A Don Feeley penalty did not lift Roscommon, the team falling to Kerry by a scoreline of 1–12 to 1–6. It was O'Dwyer's second All-Ireland SFC medal.

All-Ireland defeats
A largely facile 1–18 to 1-10 of New York secured the 1963 league title for Kerry. It was O'Dwyer's third winners' medal in the secondary competition. He later added a sixth Munster SFC medal to his collection after a 1–18 to 3–7 defeat of Cork.

In the summer of 1964, O'Dwyer's career seemed at an end when he broke both his legs. The first break occurred during a challenge match in Sneem, when a player fell on him. No sooner was he out of plaster than his other leg was broken in a county league game. It was a mark of his tenacity that he was named at centre-forward for Kerry's All-Ireland final meeting with Galway on 27 September 1964. The game turned into a battle between Mick O'Connell and Cyril Dunne. The former scored seven of Kerry's points while the latter converted nine. After Galway took a four-point lead in the opening ten minutes they never looked back. A full-time score of 0–15 to 0–10 resulted in a defeat for O'Dwyer's side.

After a one-year absence, O'Dwyer won a seventh Munster SFC medal in 1965 as Limerick were defeated by 2–16 to 2–7. On 26 September 1965, Kerry faced Galway in a second consecutive All-Ireland SFC final. Galway raced out of the starting blocks once again; however, the game was not without incident. Kerry's Derry O'Shea and Galway's John Donnellan were sent-off. Major scoring threat Mick O'Connell was curtailed; however, Kerry launched a great comeback. In the end the 0–12 to 0–9 score line resulted in Galway retaining the championship for the second year in-a-row. Following this defeat O'Dwyer decided to retire from inter-county football.

Successful return
After a two-year absence from the Kerry team, O'Dwyer ended his retirement and returned to the starting fifteen in 1968. A 1–21 to 3–8 defeat of reigning champions Cork gave him an eighth Munster SFC medal. Kerry faced old rivals Down in the All-Ireland SFC final on 22 September 1968. Down player Seán O'Neill got the inside of his boot to a rebounding ball to score a goal after six minutes. A Brendan Lynch goal for Kerry in the final minute was little more than a consolation as Down won the game by 2–12 to 1–13.

In 1969 O'Dwyer won a fourth league medal following an aggregate 2–33 to 2–24 defeat of New York. He later won a ninth Munster SFC medal as Kerry accounted for old rivals Cork by a scoreline of 0–16 to 1–4. On 14 September 1969, Kerry faced Offaly in what was the very first championship meeting between the two sides. Kerry goalkeeper Johnny Culloty made two great saves in the first half and another straight after the interval. Kerry held onto a three-point lead from the interval until the final whistle and a 0–10 to 0–7 victory gave O'Dwyer a third All-Ireland SFC medal. He was later named Texaco Footballer of the Year.

Kerry made it three-in-a-row in Munster in 1970, with O'Dwyer collecting his tenth provincial medal following a 2–22 to 2–9 defeat of Cork. On 27 September 1970, Kerry faced Meath in the first eighty-minute All-Ireland SFC final. O'Dwyer's side took an eight-point lead; however, this was cut back to just three by Meath. Din Joe Crowley's "goal of the century" four minutes from the end sealed a 2–19 to 0–18 victory and a fourth All-Ireland SFC medal for O'Dwyer. In winning this title O'Dwyer finished the season as top scorer, as well as joining a unique group of players to win All-Ireland SFC medals in each of three decades.

Decline
In 1971 Kerry qualified for the league final once again. Mayo provided the opposition; however, a 0–10 to 0–8 victory gave O'Dwyer a fifth league medal.

Kerry dominated the secondary competition once again in 1972, with O'Dwyer securing a sixth league medal following a 2–11 to 1–9 defeat of Mayo. For the seventh year in succession Kerry faced reigning champions Cork in the subsequent Munster SFC final. A 2–21 to 2–15 victory gave O'Dwyer his eleventh and final Munster SFC medal. Offaly, a team which had won its first ever All-Ireland SFC title the previous year, provided the opposition in the subsequent All-Ireland SFC final on 24 September 1972. Noel Cooney of Offaly and Brendan Lynch of Kerry exchanged goals during the game, while Offaly captain Tony McTague converted six points for his side. At the full-time whistle both sides were level, 1–13 apiece. In the drawn game (four weeks later on 15 October 1972), both sides exchanged tit-for-tat scorers; however, Offaly broke Kerry's defence after forty-eight minutes when Pat Fenning's long speculative ball hopped over the line without anyone touching it. The 1–19 to 0–13 victory for Offaly turned out to be Kerry's biggest ever defeat in an All-Ireland SFC final.

In 1973 Kerry retained their league title for a third successive year. The 2–12 to 0–14 defeat of Offaly gave 37-year-old O'Dwyer his seventh league medal. Kerry later suffered their biggest ever defeat in a provincial decider when Cork accounted for O'Dwyer's side by 5–12 to 1-15.

O'Dwyer remained with the Kerry team during the 1973-74 league season, albeit making just one appearance in a fourth round defeat by Cork. He retired from inter-county football following a challenge game against Sligo prior to the start of the championship.

Management career

Kerry
O'Dwyer retired as a player in 1974 and was appointed manager of the Kerry team in 1975. During his fifteen years as manager O'Dwyer's Kerry teams played in ten All-Ireland SFC finals, winning eight of them. During this period as manager, five of his players won eight All-Ireland SFC medals. Four of his players won 8 Texaco Footballer of the Year Awards and overall his players won 71 All Stars Awards. O'Dwyer retired as Kerry manager in 1989 but moved onto other teams. His management career with Kerry spanned the years 1975 through 1989, a period in which Kerry played 55 games, winning 43 of them, losing 7 of them and drawing the other 5.

O'Dwyer has also been credited with beginning "unsanctioned commercialism" within Gaelic games when he had the Kerry team arrived at the 1982 Munster Senior Football Championship final in Adidas-branded sportswear in exchange for £10,000 that went towards a team holiday fund. Then, on the morning of the 1985 All-Ireland Senior Football Championship Final, O'Dwyer and his Kerry players featured in an advertisement for Bendix washing machines, with the line "Only Bendix could whitewash this lot".

Kildare
As manager of the Kildare county team in 1998, O'Dwyer led them to a Leinster SFC title and the 1998 All-Ireland Senior Football Championship Final; however, Galway defeated his team by four points in that game. His management career with Kildare lasted two periods, the first was 1991–1994 and the second was 1997–2002. He managed the county in 33 games, with 16 wins, 11 losses and six draws. In 1998, he managed the team to a first Leinster SFC title in 42 years.

Laois
At the age of 66 O'Dwyer took over as manager of the Laois county team, appointed for a two-year term in 2002, one month after departing Kildare.

He led it to Leinster SFC titles in 2003 and 2004. Laois also reached the Leinster SFC final under O'Dwyer in both the 2005 and 2006 seasons. At the beginning of the football championship in 2006, O'Dywer announced that 2006 would be his last season with Laois; however, he had not ruled out moving as manager to another team. It was first revealed on 6 September 2006 that O'Dwyer would not be staying on at Laois for another season having made his final appearance as Laois manager against Kerry in the All-Ireland SFC semi-finals. His Laois career between 2003 and 2006, included 19 games, which finished as 11 wins, five losses and three draws.

County chairman Dick Miller confirmed O'Dwyer had left.

Wicklow
In 2006, O'Dwyer took charge of the Wicklow county team. He made his debut as Wicklow manager with a win against Carlow in the 2007 O'Byrne Cup.

On 5 July 2009, Wicklow defeated Fermanagh by a scoreline of 0–17 to 1–11. This marked a milestone for O'Dwyer as it meant he had defeated every other county during his terms as manager of different teams.

On 16 July 2011, O'Dwyer announced the end of his tenure as Wicklow manager following defeat to Armagh in Round 3 of the All-Ireland SFC qualifiers.

Clare
On 2 November 2012, it was confirmed that O'Dwyer had been ratified as manager of the Clare county team for the 2013 season.

He stepped down in the summer of 2013 due to an unsuccessful year.

In January 2014, aged 77, he confirmed that he had retired as an inter-county manager, though he was open to the possibility of an advisory role depending on the offer.

Personal life
O'Dwyer worked as a hotelier, as well as running an undertaker service.

Honours

As player

Kerry
All-Ireland Senior Football Championships: 4
 1959, 1962, 1969, 1970
 Munster Senior Football Championship:
 Winner (12): 1958, 1959, 1960, 1961, 1962, 1963, 1964 (sub), 1965, 1968, 1969, 1970, 1972
 Runner-up (4): 1956, 1971, 1973, 1974
 Eight National Football League Championships
 One Munster Junior Football Championship
 One Railway Cup
 Three Kerry Senior Football Championship finals with Waterville as player-coach

As manager

Kerry
All-Ireland Senior Football Championships: 8
 1975, 1978, 1979, 1980, 1981, 1984, 1985, 1986
 Runner-up (2): 1976, 1982
Munster Senior Football Championships: 11
 1975, 1976, 1977, 1978, 1979, 1980, 1981, 1982, 1984, 1985, 1986
 Runner-up (4): 1983, 1987, 1988, 1989

Kildare
Leinster Senior Football Championships: 2
 1998, 2000

Laois
Leinster Senior Football Championships: 1
 2003

Waterville
 Three Kerry Senior Football Championship finals with Waterville as player-coach

Munster
 Six Railway Cup titles

See also
 Micko, a documentary

References

External links

 Mick O'Dwyer and Páidí Ó Sé on Miriam Meets...  RTÉ Sport

 

1936 births
Living people
Gaelic football managers
Irish funeral directors
Gaelic football forwards
Irish hoteliers
Kerry inter-county Gaelic footballers
Munster inter-provincial Gaelic footballers
Texaco Footballers of the Year
Waterville Gaelic footballers